Kallamparai is a small village located in the Tuticorin district of Tamil Nadu, India.

Kallamparai is home to about 120 families, whose main occupation is agriculture.

References

Villages in Thoothukudi district